Mjellby Art Museum (Mjellby konstmuseum)  is situated outside Halmstad, Sweden. There is  an art gallery featuring exhibitions of diverse content – everything from 1900s modernists to current contemporary art.

Mjellby Art Museum, also known as the Halmstadgruppen's museum, was established by the members of the Halmstadgruppen, whose work is often presented here in new formations. Here is a large permanent collection of the group's art. The museum's art gallery shows annually four to five exhibitions of everything from contemporary art to modernism. The museum was founded in 1980 by Swedish art critic and museum director Viveka Bosson. She was the daughter of Erik Olson, one of the members in Halmstadgruppen. Bosson bought the former site of the Mjellby folkskola (elementary school) outside Halmstad in 1980, setting up Mjellby Art Museum and later donated it to the Halmstad Municipality.

References

Other sources
Jan Torsten Ahlstrand; Viveka Bosson   (2009) Halmstadgruppen, ett kraftfält i svensk 1900-talskonst (Stiftelsen Halmstadgruppen) 
Palmsköld, Hugo  Halmstadgruppen (Häftad bok Fogtdal)

External links 
Mjellby konstmuseum – Halmstadgruppens museum website

Art museums and galleries in Sweden
Art museums established in 1980
1980 establishments in Sweden
Museums in Halland County